This is a partial list of molecules that contain 14 carbon atoms.

See also
 Carbon number
 List of compounds with carbon number 13
 List of compounds with carbon number 15

C14